Andy Dunlop (born Andrew Dunlop, 16 March 1972, Lenzie, East Dunbartonshire, Scotland) is a Scottish musician, who is the lead guitarist of Scottish indie band, Travis.

Biography
Dunlop attended Lenzie Academy. The band Travis got their break with the album The Man Who, named after a bestselling book. The album was internationally successful, and became the biggest selling album in the UK in 1999.

As well as being the guitarist, Dunlop has also contributed several songs. "You Don't Know What I'm Like", "Ancient Train" (both featuring Dunlop on lead vocals), "Central Station" and "The Sea" (with Fran Healy taking lead vocals). For their sixth album, Ode to J. Smith, Dunlop contributed "Quite Free", which he co-wrote with Fran Healy and Dougie Payne. Also on Travis' fifth studio album he co-wrote "3 Times and You Lose" and "Big Chair".
Dunlop continues to write songs and delivered songs like "Boxes", "The big screen" and "Parallel lines" for the album "Where you stand".

Together with Guy Berryman and Will Champion of Coldplay, Dunlop contributed to the first solo album of a-ha keyboardist Magne Furuholmen entitled Past Perfect Future Tense.

Dunlop is known for the long fingernails on his right hand which he uses instead of picks, much like a flamenco guitarist.
Dunlop is married to Jo Monaghan. In December 2005 the couple's first child, a son, was born, and is named Dylan Green Dunlop.

References

Travis (band) members
1972 births
Living people
Scottish pop guitarists
Scottish rock guitarists
Scottish male guitarists
Musicians from Lenzie
People educated at Lenzie Academy